The Union of Benefices Act was legislation which prevented the need for other Acts if following its prescribed three-stage scheme. It enabled reduction of the number of parish churches and vicars/rectors in London's "Metropolis", as defined by a narrower Act five years before.  It instead allowed commissions to recommend dissolution to various parties, which would then be a formality agreed by Order-in-Council.

It was chiefly used for the City of London, as its residential population declined in favour of commercial land use in the second half of the 19th century.

Mechanism
 Sections 3 to 6 imposed and regulated prior, unpaid, commissions of inquiry.Three of the Commissioners shall be beneficed Clergymen residing within the Diocese, of whom One shall be nominated by the Dean and Chapter of the Cathedral Church of Saint Paul , and Two by the Bishop of the Diocese, and the remaining Two shall be Lay Members of the Church of England and shall be nominated to the Bishop by the Corporation of the City of London"
 Section 7.If the Return to the Commission shall recommend an Union, the Bishop shall cause Proposals for a Scheme, based upon the Terms recommended, to be prepared for effecting the Union, which Proposals, with the Consent thereto in Writing of the Patron or Patrons of each of the Benefices affected, shall be transmitted by the Bishop to the Churchwardens of each Parish proposed to be united, in order that the same may be considered by the Inhabitants in Vestry assembled; and all such Proposals shall have especial Regard to the Residence of the Incumbent on the Benefice proposed to be constituted the united Benefice, and shall contain all necessary Provisions conducing to such Residence."
Section 8.Vestry to notify Assent, Suggestions for modification or Objections. Bishop to transmit final Proposals to Ecclesiastical Commissioners, to prepare Scheme, and certify same to the Queen in Council (in practice the Privy Council of the United Kingdom).

Eventual effects

As churchyards were emptied for buildings such as the new railway stations and roads, many remains were exhumed and re-interred in the City of London Cemetery.

This Act was extended by the Union of Benefices Act 1898  This simply stated any such scheme "may be made if it provides for the erection of another church or parsonage for a benefice in the vicinity of the metropolis" [including] "any benefice within or partly within the Metropolitan Police District".

Notes

External links

United Kingdom Acts of Parliament 1860